Russell James (born 1962 in Perth) is a fashion, celebrity and beauty photographer. Russell was born in Western Australia and spent much of his childhood moving from city to city due to his working class father. After dropping out of school at age 14, Russell got his first job working in a factory that made trashcans. After working in the factory, Russell held several odd jobs to make ends met before becoming a police officer, which lasted several years. After traveling to Japan and Sweden Russell arrived in the United States in 1989.

Career
Russell James is most famous for his work as the main photographer for Victoria's Secret, but his work has appeared in a large range of magazines, including Vogue, Sports Illustrated, W, Marie Claire, and GQ. James has worked with many celebrities and fashion models, such as Alessandra Ambrósio, Tyra Banks, Kendall Jenner, Gisele Bündchen, Naomi Campbell, Karolína Kurková, Adriana Lima, Michelle Alves, Marisa Miller, Ana Beatriz Barros, Heidi Klum, Angela Lindvall, Fernanda Motta, Oluchi Onweagba, Miranda Kerr, Behati Prinsloo and Erin Wasson.

Russell James has appeared several times in America's Next Top Model, Australia's Next Top Model and Germany's Next Topmodel, as a guest photographer or judge.

Russell James was one of the twelve Hasselblad Masters Award recipients in 2007.

James also directs art films, music videos, and television commercials for Victoria's Secret and Gillette.

Books
 Ellen von Unwerth, Raphael Mazzucco, Russell James (photographers): "Sexy" : A Tribute to a Decade of Sexy Swimwear, Victoria's Secret, 2005 (3 volumes).

References

External links
 
 
 Becoming Jangala - Biography, Australian Story

Australian photographers
Fashion photographers
Living people
1962 births